Sapsojärvet is a medium-sized lake in Kainuu region in northern Finland. The name is in plural, and it can also be in singular: Sapsojärvi. The lake is almost divided in two parts, Iso-Sapsojärvi and Kiantajärvi. The lake in situated in the Sotkamo municipality, quite center in the village. It is often in Finnish television, because in the shore there is a stadium for Finnish baseball.

See also
List of lakes in Finland

References

Lakes of Sotkamo